The Nagoya Cyclones are an American football team located in Nagoya, Aichi, Japan.  They are a member of the X-League.

Seasons

References

External links
  (Japanese)

American football in Japan
1980 establishments in Japan
American football teams established in 1980
X-League teams